Aetna is an unincorporated community in Sharp County, Arkansas, United States. It lies at an elevation of 404 feet (123 m).

References

Unincorporated communities in Sharp County, Arkansas
Unincorporated communities in Arkansas